Gongylosoma mukutense is a species of snake of the superfamily Colubroidea.

Geographic range
The snake is found in Malaysia.

References 

Colubrids
Endemic fauna of Malaysia
Reptiles of Malaysia
Snakes of Asia
Critically endangered fauna of Asia
Reptiles described in 2003